The 1974 Wightman Cup was the 46th edition of the annual women's team tennis competition between the United States and Great Britain. It was held at the Deeside Leisure Centre in Queensferry, Flintshire in Wales.

References

1974
1974 in tennis
1974 in women's tennis
1974 in American tennis
1974 in British women's sport
1974 in Welsh sport